Operation Acid Drop was a British Commando raid during the Second World War. This was the first commando raid carried out by No. 5 Commando and consisted of two simultaneous operations over the night of 30/31 August 1941. Each raid consisted of one officer and 14 men, their targets were the beaches at Hardelot and Merlimont in the Pas-de-Calais, France  with the aim of carrying out reconnaissance and if possible, to capture a German soldier. It was a hit and run type raid with only 30 minutes ashore but in the event neither party encountered any Germans.

References

Conflicts in 1941
World War II British Commando raids
Battles and conflicts without fatalities
1941 in France